St John of God Mt Lawley Hospital is a 205-bed private hospital located on the banks of the Swan River in Mount Lawley, Western Australia.

Established in 1937, the hospital was initially known as St Anne's Hospital and then became Mercy Hospital in 1996. In November 2013 St John of God Health Care purchased the hospital and subsequently changed the name to St John of God Mt Lawley Hospital.

St John of God Mt Lawley Hospital is a division of St John of God Health Care.

History 
Mercy Hospital was established by the Sisters of Mercy as St Anne's Nursing Home on 10 April 1937 and later as St Anne's Hospital. In 1996 it changed its name to Mercy Hospital as part of commemorations celebrating the 150th anniversary of the arrival of the Sisters of Mercy in the state.

St John of God Health Care purchased the hospital in November 2013.

It became known as St John of God Mt Lawley Hospital on 5 May 2014, and the official handover ceremony took place on 6 June of that year.

Facilities 
St John of God Mt Lawley Hospital has 205 beds and 8 operating theatres.

The hospital also contains endoscopy, pathology, radiology, a hydrotherapy pool and an on-site specialist medical centre.

References

External links

Hospitals in Perth, Western Australia
St John of God Health Care